Survivor BG: The Hidden Idol was the sixth season of the Bulgarian reality television series of Survivor BG. 

The season had 20 contestants competed in tribes facing off against each other in the Philippines where they competed for rewards and immunity to avoid being eliminated themselves. 

After 43 days, the jury decided Zoran Petrovski to win 150,000 leva and the title of Sole Survivor.

The series returned after being off-air for 8 years with Vladimir Karamazov returned to present the series. 

The season premiered on 21 February 2022 on bTV. 

The season final was aired on 27 April 2022 on bTV with Zoran Petrovski winning 150,000 leva and the title of Sole Survivor.

Contestants

Challenges

Tribal Phase

Individual Phase

Voting History

Tribal Phase

Individual Phase

Notes

See also

References

External links
 

Bulgaria
Bulgarian reality television series
2022 Bulgarian television seasons